The LSWR 273 class was a class of double framed 0-6-0 steam locomotives designed by William George Beattie for the London and South Western Railway (LSWR). Twelve locomotives were built between 1872 and 1873.

Numbering
The twelve locomotives were numbered in two blocks of 6 locomotives each. Between 1898 and 1900, all were placed on the duplicate list, usually by prefix the number with a "0". Two were scrapped in 1906, but the remainder were renumbered again in 1914–1917 before four more were retired prior to the 1923 grouping, leaving six to pass into Southern Railway ownership on 1 January 1923, before they too were withdrawn and scrapped.

References

273
0-6-0 locomotives
Railway locomotives introduced in 1872
Scrapped locomotives
Standard gauge steam locomotives of Great Britain